Pfatter is a river of Bavaria, Germany. It flows into the Danube near the town Pfatter.

See also
List of rivers of Bavaria

References

Rivers of Bavaria
Regensburg (district)
Rivers of Germany